Nicolás Dujovne (born May 18, 1967) is an Argentine economist and former Minister of the Treasury between 2017 and 2019 under the administration of Mauricio Macri.

Early life and education
Nicolás Dujovne was born in Buenos Aires on 18 May 1967. He is the son of the architect Berardo Dujovne. He graduated with a degree in Economics from the University of Buenos Aires Faculty of Economic Sciences and the University of California, as well as undertaking postgraduate studies at the Universidad Torcuato Di Tella. He was a professor at the University of Buenos Aires.

Public management
He was Secretary of the National Treasury Department between 1997 and 1998 as chief of advisors to Pablo Guidotti, during the presidency of Carlos Menem. He was also appointed by the State to be the director of Papel Prensa S. A., a newsprint paper manufacturer, and represented the Ministry of Economy in the Central Bank of Argentina.

Private sector
In the private sector, from 2001 to 2011, he was the chief economist at Banco Galicia in Buenos Aires. He then worked in various consultancies until in 2014 he founded his own financial consulting firm specializing in macroeconomics, serving there as a director. He has also been a consultant to the World Bank in Buenos Aires and Washington, D.C.

He was a columnist in the daily newspaper La Nación and co-hosted the program Odyssey Argentina on the television channel Todo Noticias of the Clarín Group.

Politics
In 2010 he was economic advisor for the presidential campaign of Ricardo Alfonsín, the son of President Raúl Alfonsín. Close to Mauricio Macri, Dujovne has been coordinator of the economic cabinet of his government, along with Mario Quintana, working in the technical teams of the Pensar Foundation, and contributing during his presidential campaign on fiscal issues. Since 2012 he has also advised the block of the Radical Civic Union of the Senate of the Argentine Nation, forming part of the temporary plant.

On December 26, 2016, after the dismissal of Alfonso Prat-Gay by President Macri, the splitting into two of the Ministry of Finance and Public Finance was announced, with Dujovne being appointed Minister of Finance from January 2017. Prior to assuming office, he resigned from the Senate and closed his consultancy.

Minister of the Treasury
Dujovne faced a deep fiscal adjustment promoted by Macri and deepened by the International Monetary Fund.

In 2017, he faced the tax reform, which he managed to pass in Congress after some conflicts with industrial sectors due to internal tax increases or rebalancing of employer contributions. The fiscal pressure ended in 2019 almost two points less than in 2015.

He signed a pact with the provinces to fiscally order their accounts and begin to lower the gross income and the stamp tax. Once the elections were won, a new index was launched to update inflation with the intention of lowering the deficit further.

Its first year ended with a 2.9% increase in gross domestic product, after a 2016 dulled by high inflation and the fall of the economy. That performance was key for the Macri government to win the midterm legislative elections and revalidate its power.

After the crisis that began in April 2018, the year that ended with stagflation, everything changed. Dujovne looked for ways to restore confidence by taking fiscal balance as an anchor, but nothing worked until the arrival of the International Monetary Fund, an idea attributed to Luis Caputo.

The reestablishment of withholdings in mid-July was a serious blow to the economic team, which maintained that the improvement in the fiscal balance should be due to a drop in spending (something that it eventually achieved) and not due to the rise in income (which it ended up promoting). He then sealed a 2019 Budget with the opposition. That budget impaired some improvements in the tax reform.

Key to this leap was the strong link with Washington, particularly with Steven Mnuchin, US Secretary of the Treasury and Donald Trump's man of confidence, with the IMF's technical teams and with the 2018 G20 Ministers of Economy (Dujovne acted as coordinator, when Argentina was the first host country).

After the Stand-By Agreement, Caputo broke the rules that the IMF imposed to intervene in the exchange market and had to resign. The BCRA was left in the hands of Guido Sandleris, former deputy finance minister. It was a rise in power for Dujovne within Macri's economic team.

After achieving a historic agreement (due to the significant disbursement), an expansion of it and an acceleration of disbursements, the Government did not manage to provoke sustainable tranquility in the financial and exchange markets, until April 2019, when the IMF finally freed its hands to the BCRA to intervene if the dollar soared.

After his resignation in August 2019, he said that: "he contributed to the construction of a different country, modern, integrated into the world, plural and with the necessary macroeconomic balances for sustainable development"; and noted the achievements in reducing the fiscal deficit and public spending and in reducing distorting taxes in the provinces.

Other activities
 Central American Bank for Economic Integration (CABEI), Ex-Officio Member of the Board of Governors (2016-2019)
 Inter-American Investment Corporation (IIC), Ex-Officio Member of the Board of Governors (2016-2019)
 International Monetary Fund (IMF), Ex-Officio Member of the Board of Governors (2016-2019)
 Joint World Bank-IMF Development Committee, Member (2018)
 World Bank, Ex-Officio Member of the Board of Governors (2016-2019)
 Multilateral Investment Guarantee Agency (MIGA), World Bank Group, Ex-Officio Member of the Board of Governors (2016-2019)

References

External links 
 Nicolás Dujovne: conductor de TN, columnista de La Nación y asesor de Cambiemos en la campaña

1967 births
Living people
Argentine Jews
Jewish economists
Argentine economists
Argentine Ministers of Finance
Argentine people of Ukrainian-Jewish descent
Jewish Argentine politicians